Preety & Pinky are the Indipop duo singers. The sisters hail from a Gujarati family.

Career
This duo had started singing at very young age when they were five and seven years old. They also sang for many Bollywood films. Besides Hindi, they sang songs in English, Malayalam, Gujarati, Sindhi, Marathi, and Bhojpuri. In addition to their popularity in India, they are also very well known in United States, Canada and England.

Filmography

Awards

 2001 - Nomination Filmfare Best Playback singer (Female) award for song "Piya Piya" From the Movie Har Dil Jo Pyaar Karega.
 2001 - Nomination IIFA Award for Best Female Playback for song "Piya Piya" From the Movie Har Dil Jo Pyaar Karega.

References

External links

Filmfare Awards winners
Indian women pop singers
Indian musical duos
Indian women playback singers
Bollywood playback singers
21st-century Indian women singers
21st-century Indian singers